Miel luxembourgeois de marque nationale is a honey from Luxembourg that is protected under EU law with PDO status.

Some of the criteria for the production of this honey include that it:
must be of high quality
may not contain any imported honey
may not contain any additives
must have a water content of less than 20%

References

External links
Luxembourg National Tourist Office - Honey

Luxembourgian products with protected designation of origin
Honey
Luxembourgian cuisine